Cindy or Cynthia Brown may refer to:

Cindy Brown (basketball) (born 1965), American basketball player
Cindy Brown (field hockey) (born 1985), South African field hockey player
Cindy Lynn Brown (born 1973), Danish-American poet
Cynthia Gwyn Brown, Playboy model
Cynthia Brown (singer), French singer
Cynthia Stokes Brown (1938–2017), American educator-historian